Richard Bucknor (born November 6, 1966) is a Jamaican athlete specializing in the 110m hurdles. He competed in the 1988 Summer Olympics in Seoul, finishing 12th, and in the 1992 Summer Olympics in Barcelona. In 1990, while a part of Texas A&M's track team, he was awarded the All-American title.

References 

Living people
1966 births
Jamaican male hurdlers
Athletes (track and field) at the 1988 Summer Olympics
Athletes (track and field) at the 1992 Summer Olympics
Olympic athletes of Jamaica
Athletes (track and field) at the 1991 Pan American Games
Pan American Games competitors for Jamaica
Texas A&M Aggies men's track and field athletes